Krishna Dasgupta (born as Krishna Ganguly, 29 December 1937 – 2013) was a renowned Bengali classical singer and music teacher from West Bengal, India, who sang numerous songs in Bengali language movies and non-film as well, particularly during the 1950s, 60s and 70s. She is widely known for lending voice in Mahisasuramardini, the popular early Bengali special dawn radio programme that has been broadcast since 1931 on All India Radio (AIR) in West Bengal.

Early life 
Krishna Dasgupta was born in Janai, Hooghly in West Bengal on 29 December 1937. She was a noted disciple of renowned Indian classical vocalists Acharya Tarapada Chakraborty and Ustad Amir Khan.

Career 
Krishna Dasgupta was an accomplished versatile singer, particularly known for her khyal, thumri, bhajan, as well as Bengali modern songs. She had a special style of performance that made her recitals unique.  She had done playback for songs composed by Pandit Jnan Prakash Ghosh, as well for Bengali films like Asamapta (1956), Ektara (1957), Rajlakshmi O Srikanta (1958), Bhranti, Nader Nimai (1960) and Bipasha (1962), among others. She had performed at various music conferences too.

She is widely known today for lending voice in Mahisasuramardini, the popular early Bengali special dawn radio programme that has been broadcast since 1931 on All India Radio (AIR) in West Bengal. In the program, she sang the song Akhilo Bimane Tabo Jayagaane.

Death and legacy 
Krishna Dasgupta died in 2013 in Kolkata. 

One of her students, Nandini Chakraborty, the daughter of renowned cinematographer Ramananda Sengupta, has created a documentary on her life, Harano Sur.

References

External links 
 

1937 births
2013 deaths
Bengali playback singers
Singers from Kolkata
Indian women playback singers
21st-century Indian women singers
20th-century Indian singers
Women musicians from West Bengal
20th-century Indian women singers
21st-century Indian singers